Rose Island was an abandoned amusement park near Charlestown, Indiana, situated on a peninsula (the "Devil's Backbone") created by Fourteen Mile Creek emptying into the Ohio River.  It was a recreational area known as Fern Grove in the 1880s, mostly used as a church camp.  It was so named due to the many ferns that grew there.  The Louisville and Jeffersonville Ferry Company acquired it and developed it in order to increase the use of its ferry business.  As Fern Grove it thrived on church picnics and family outings.

The Great Depression hurt business, but its closure was due to damage caused by the 1937 Flood.  Ten feet of water covered the park, and the damage was too much in order to rebuild for the 1937 season. Trees have fallen on the bridge and have destroyed all but the supports. Although covered with ivy, the swimming pool was still in excellent condition as late as 1980.  Most of the buildings have left no trace, although a few brick formations remain.

Heyday
In 1923 David Rose purchased the property, added an amusement park, hotel, and swimming pool, spending $250,000 in the process, and renamed it Rose Island. It included a wooden coaster, termed a racing derby and named the Devil's Backbone in honor of the rock formation, and a Ferris wheel. There were wolves in a pen, monkeys in a cage, and a black bear named Teddy Roosevelt. There was also a combined dance hall/roller skating rink. To access it, people either took a steamboat or they drove to a footbridge. One of the steamboats was called Idlewild, which would later become the Belle of Louisville. Others were the Steamer America, City of Cincinnati, and the Columbia. There were also speedboats, such as the Vivianne III, that could quickly take businessmen back to Louisville. A ticket to ride the steamboat from Madison was 50 cents.

Today
Rose Island became part of the Indiana Army Ammunition Plant.  When the plant was deactivated, the land was given to the new Charlestown State Park.  There was no land access to the area where Rose Island was located, but the concrete pilings of the footbridge connecting the peninsula to the mainland remain and can be seen from one of the park's hiking trails.  The state of Indiana has completed a bridge to the Rose Island area for state park visitors. Access to the bridge is provided through Trail 3.  The area is also accessible by boat.

In September 2011, the historic Portersville Bridge was relocated and reconstructed to cross the creek and connect the island for the first time.

Gallery

See also
Fontaine Ferry Park
History of Louisville, Kentucky
List of attractions and events in the Louisville metropolitan area

References

External links

 WHAS11NEWS Special Report About Rose Island Part 1
 WHAS11NEWS Special Report About Rose Island Part 2
 WHAS11NEWS Historic Photos Slide Show of Rose Island
 Information about Rose Island
 River to Rail project:  Marks and Benson and the American Boys Excursions
 Riverboats that visited Rose Island

1923 establishments in Indiana
1937 disestablishments in Indiana
Charlestown, Indiana
Defunct amusement parks in the United States
Former buildings and structures in Indiana
Amusement parks opened in 1923
Amusement parks closed in 1937
Modern ruins